Zoran Lilić (Serbian Cyrillic: Зоран Лилић; born 27 August 1954) is a Serbian and former Yugoslav politician. He served as President of the National Assembly of Serbia from 1992 to 1994, and as President of the Federal Republic of Yugoslavia from 1994 to 1997.

Biography
He was born to a Serb father and a Romanian mother. He finished primary and secondary school in his native village. He graduated from the University of Belgrade Faculty of Technology and worked in the rubber factory "Rekord" in Rakovica. After twelve years of performing various duties, he was appointed director general.

He was an MP of the Socialist Party of Serbia (SPS) in the National Assembly of Serbia, and then he became the Speaker of the National Assembly. He was named president of the Federal Republic of Yugoslavia after Dobrica Ćosić was forced to resign. He remained at the forefront of Third Yugoslavia until 1997, though it was generally understood he was a puppet for Serbian president Slobodan Milošević.

In 1994, Lilić called on the "extreme fractions in RS and RSK to stop holding the entire Serbian people hostage."

In 1997, Milošević was termed out of the Serbian presidency, and was elected to the federal presidency.  Lilić became the SPS candidate to succeed Milošević as president of Serbia. After the unsuccessful second round with Vojislav Šešelj he became vice president of the Federal Government in the cabinet of Momir Bulatović, and he remained on this duty until April 1999. year when he was appointed advisor to the President of the Federal Republic of Yugoslavia Slobodan Milošević for economic relations with Croatia. At that time he performed the functions of chairman of Jugotransport and the president of Chess Association of Yugoslavia. He left SPS in 2000 founded the Serbian Socialdemocratic Party, which he claims to be following the idea of Svetozar Marković. His party did not have success in election.

Lilić involved himself in attempting to sort out the HIV trial in Libya, where four Bulgarian nurses and one Palestinian doctor were sentenced to death for allegedly infecting Libyan babies with the HIV virus.  Lilić reportedly falsely posed as an envoy or messenger of the Bulgarian president, Georgi Parvanov.

References

1954 births
Living people
People from Kladovo
Presidents of the National Assembly (Serbia)
Socialist Party of Serbia politicians
Serbian people of Romanian descent
University of Belgrade alumni
Presidents of Serbia and Montenegro
Candidates for President of Serbia